Rotana may refer to:

Rotana Group, business group that includes investments in media and music
Rotana Hotels, international chain of hotels
Beach Rotana Abu Dhabi
Rotana Media Services (RMS) and RMS Outdoor
Rotana Magazine
Rotana (radio), chain of Rotana radios stations in the Arab World
Rotana Records, a music and entertainment company owned by Rotana Group
Rotana (television), a chain of Rotana pan-Arab general and specialty television channels
Rotana Jet, an airline based in Abu Dhabi.

See also
 Rutana (disambiguation)